Brunello Cucinelli (born 3 September 1953 in Castel Rigone) is an Italian luxury creative director and the chief executive of his eponymous made in Italy brand, Brunello Cucinelli. He donates 20% of his profits through the Brunello Cucinelli Foundation. He has been described as a "philosopher-designer".

Early life and education
Cucinelli grew up in a rural agricultural community outside of Perugia. His childhood home had no electricity or running water.
Cucinelli dropped out of engineering school at age 24, choosing instead to read philosophical texts on his own.

Career
Cucinelli's first product was cashmere wool sweaters in bright colors. In 1977 he started making dyed cashmere in a small workshop. He founded Brunello Cucinelli SpA in 1978 with the Italian lira equivalent of about $550; after the initial public offering of Brunello Cucinelli SpA his personal net worth exceeded $1 billion.

In June of 2021, due to the ownership of 50.05% of the shares of Brunello Cucinelli S.p.A., Brunello had a personal net worth of approximately 2.2 billion dollars.

Architecture
Cucinelli believes that architecture "needs to symbolize higher meanings besides serving a material purpose." He collaborated on the re-design and expansion of Solomeo with Italian architect Massimo de Vico. In 2021, Cucinelli announced that he would again be partnering with de Vico to transform one of Solomeo's 18th-century villas into a "Universal Library" that will carry books on philosophy, architecture, literature, poetry and craftsmanship.

Philanthropy
In 2018, Cucinelli raised €100 million for charity by selling 6% of his shares.
His company gives about 20% of the profits to charity, with which he restored many works of art throughout Umbria, and he bought many lands around Solomeo, the town where he lives and where his company is based.

Awards and honors
Leonardo Prize
 Honorary degree in philosophy and human relationships ethics from University of Perugia
 Cavaliere del lavoro – Italian Order of Merit for Labour in 2010
 Premio Guido Carli, 2011
Pitti Immagine Uomo prize 
Fashion Group International, Fashion Star Honoree Award, October 2014
Global Economy Prize for “Honorable Merchant” from the Government of Germany
America Award of the Italy-USA Foundation in 2019

Personal life
Cucinelli is married to his hometown sweetheart Federica, and the couple have two daughters: Camilla and Carolina.

References

External links

Official site

1953 births
Living people
People from the Province of Perugia
Italian fashion designers
Italian philanthropists
Italian businesspeople in fashion
Brunello Cucinelli
Compasso d'Oro Award recipients